Zoviḱ is a village in the municipality of Novaci, North Macedonia. It used to be part of the former municipality of Staravina.

Demographics
According to the 2002 census, the village had a total of 31 inhabitants. Ethnic groups in the village include:

Macedonians 31

References

Villages in Novaci Municipality